Mikhaylovo is a rural locality in Shchetinsky Selsoviet Rural Settlement, Kursky District, Kursk Oblast, Russia. Population:

Geography 
The village is located on the Vinogrobl River (a left tributary of the Tuskar in the basin of the Seym), 104 km from the Russia–Ukraine border, 4 km north-east of the district center – the town Kursk, 6 km from the selsoviet center – Shchetinka.

 Climate
Mikhaylovo has a warm-summer humid continental climate (Dfb in the Köppen climate classification).

Transport 
Mikhaylovo is located 9 km from the federal route  (Kursk – Voronezh –  "Kaspy" Highway; a part of the European route ), 3.5 km from the road of regional importance  (Kursk – Kastornoye), on the road of intermunicipal significance  (38K-016 – Muravlevo – Mikhaylovo – Nozdrachevo), 2 km from the nearest railway station Nozdrachyovo (railway line Kursk – 146 km).

The rural locality is situated 6 km from Kursk Vostochny Airport, 129 km from Belgorod International Airport and 200 km from Voronezh Peter the Great Airport.

References

Notes

Sources

Rural localities in Kursky District, Kursk Oblast